= Giacomo Galli =

Italian painter and engraver

Lo Spadarino ("Little Sword")
- Born: Giacomo Galli; 1597; Siena, Grand Duchy of Tuscany
- Died: 1649 (aged 51–52); Rome, Papal States
- Education: Caravaggisti
- Known for: Painting
- Movement: Baroque

Giacomo Galli, commonly known as "Lo Spadarino" (1597–1649) was an Italian painter and engraver of the Papal city of Rome in the early seventeenth century.

== Biography ==
His family were originally from Florence, and were swordsmiths (or "spadari"), which contributed the Galli family nickname: Lo Spadarino (or "Little Sword"). Almost nothing is known about him, which has led to his being confused with his elder brother, Giovanni Antonio Galli (1585–1652).

== Works ==
There are very few of Giacomo Lo Spadarino's extant works. Those that still exist reflect a close development of the style of the celebrated master, Caravaggio. But instead of the high drama of the other Caravaggisti painters, Giacomo's style is warm and sombre.

His most famous work outside Italy, located in Perth, UK, 'Christ Displaying His Wounds', prefers the brilliant colours to the confronting postures of the Caravaggisti, but offers an image whose subject is more directly focused on the viewer, who is thereby invited into the scene. The chiaroscuro (technique of tonal contrasts for three-dimensional effect) is preserved.
